Hit the Ice is a 1943 film starring the comedy team of Abbott and Costello and their first film directed by Charles Lamont. Lamont later directed the team's last few films in the 1950s.

Plot
Two sidewalk photographers, Tubby McCoy and Flash Fulton, aspire to work for the local newspaper.  Their childhood friend, Dr. Bill Burns, invites them to come along on a call to a building fire.  While attempting to photograph the inferno, Tubby is injured and brought to Burns' hospital.  While they are there, Silky Fellowsby, a gangster who is admitted as a patient to establish an alibi for a robbery he is planning, mistake Tubby and Flash for two Detroit hitmen.  He expects them to guard the bank's entrance while they rob it, while they mistakenly believe that they are hired to take photographs of the gang as they leave the bank. When the bank is robbed, Tubby and Flash are considered the prime suspects.

Fellowsby heads to a ski resort in Sun Valley to "recuperate", hiring Burns and his nurse to care for him.  To clear their names, Tubby and Flash go to the resort, where they are hired as waiters. They attempt to retrieve the stolen cash by blackmailing the gangsters with the bank photographs, which turn out to be worthless since the robbers' faces are not shown. A fight ensues and after a climactic ski chase down the mountain, the gangsters are caught.

Cast

Bud Abbott as Flash Fulton
Lou Costello as Tubby McCoy
Ginny Simms as Marcia Manning
Patric Knowles as Dr. Bill Elliot (Credits) / Dr. William 'Bill' Burns (in Film)
Elyse Knox as Peggy Osborne
Joe Sawyer as Buster (Joseph Sawyer in Credits)
Marc Lawrence as Phil
Sheldon Leonard as 'Silky' Fellowsby
Johnny Long and His Orchestra as themselves

Production
Hit the Ice was put into production 12 days after the team completed It Ain't Hay. It was filmed from November 23 through December 31, 1942. Erle C. Kenton was replaced by Charles Lamont on Hit the Ice after problems with Lou Costello.

On the final day of shooting, the team appeared on their weekly radio show, where they were crowned the nation's top box-office stars for 1942 in a poll of theater exhibitors.

Rerelease
It was re-released by Realart Pictures on a double bill with an earlier Abbott and Costello film, Hold That Ghost, in 1949.

Home media
This film has been released twice on VHS. The first time on VHS and Beta in 1987 and again on VHS in 1991.

This film has been released twice on DVD.  The first time, on The Best of Abbott and Costello Volume Two, on May 4, 2004, and again on October 28, 2008 as part of Abbott and Costello: The Complete Universal Pictures Collection.

References

External links

 
 
 

1943 comedy films
Hit the Ice
Abbott and Costello films
American black-and-white films
Films directed by Charles Lamont
Films scored by Paul Sawtell
American skiing films
Universal Pictures films
American comedy films
Films shot in Sun Valley, Idaho
Films set in Sun Valley, Idaho
1940s English-language films
1940s American films